Conflict: Denied Ops is a tactical shooter video game developed by Pivotal Games and published by Eidos Interactive for Microsoft Windows, PlayStation 3 and Xbox 360. It is the fifth and final installment in the Conflict series. Originally, the game was to be called "Crossfire" but was later changed. It released on February 8, 2008, in Europe, February 12, 2008, North America, February 21, 2008, in Australia and January 16, 2009, in Japan.

It is the first game in the series to be released on the PlayStation 3 and Xbox 360. Unlike previous games in the series, this game is played in a first-person perspective.

The game takes place in a fictional war in Venezuela. Player controls the character named Lincoln Graves, a sniper who is assigned by the CIA operatives along with his partner Reggie Lang to take down General Ramirez and any other possible threats.

The game received mixed reviews from critics, garnering praise for its graphics, HUD system and destructible environment but criticized for its unoriginal and generic gameplay and broken co-op system.

Gameplay 
The game is played in a first-person perspective, instead of the third-person viewpoint of the four preceding titles, and is also the first game in the Conflict series which does not feature four main characters. Denied Ops is based around two CIA operatives, each having his own weapon and style: a sniper named Lincoln Graves who uses an SR-25 with an undermounted M26 MASS, and a machine gun operator named Reggie Lang who uses an M249 PARA with an undermounted M320 grenade launcher. The two characters have quite opposite personalities. Lang is rather loud and noisy while Graves is quiet and stealthy.

In single player mode, the player can switch between controlling each operative. In co-op, each player controls one operative. The operatives only use their weapon of choice, and cannot pick up enemy weapons. Ammunition for firearms is unlimited, but explosives are not and must be replenished at resupply boxes found throughout the levels.

Plot 
The story takes place in a fictional war in Venezuela. General Ramírez and his associates have staged the Ramírez regime where Ramírez is slowly plotting to take over his country. First he sends his troops to seize the Petro Nivera oil refinery, then threatens to deploy nuclear weapons if the United States continue to "meddle in his country's affairs". The US government sends two CIA operatives, Lincoln Graves and Reggie Lang, on a series of missions to take down General Ramírez and any other possible threat. First the two operatives are sent to the ruins of the Santa Cecilia monastery to retrieve important data on Ramírez's connections and associates. After extracting via their commander, they encounter a number of different conflicts all seemingly connected to Ramírez. Eventually they track down Ramírez and end up arresting him.

Reception 

The game received "mixed" reviews on all platforms according to the review aggregation website Metacritic. It was criticized for its unoriginal and generic gameplay and broken co-op system.  In Japan, where the game was ported for release under the name , then published by Spike for the PlayStation 3 and Xbox 360 versions on September 11, 2008, and by E Frontier for the PC version on January 16, 2009, Famitsu gave the first two console versions each a score of all four sixes for a total of 24 out of 40.

References

External links 
 

2008 video games
Cooperative video games
Eidos Interactive games
First-person shooters
Games for Windows certified games
PlayStation 3 games
Tactical shooter video games
Video games scored by Richard Jacques
Xbox 360 games
Video games set in Venezuela
Video games developed in the United Kingdom